Vasili Mikhailovich Zhupikov (16 January 1954 – 7 June 2015) was a Soviet football player and a Russian coach.

Honours
 Soviet Top League bronze: 1977.
 Soviet Cup winner: 1986.
 Top 33 players year-end list: 1977, 1978, 1983.

International career
Zhupikov made his debut for USSR on 7 September 1977 in a friendly against Poland. He played in the UEFA Euro 1980 qualifiers (USSR did not qualify for the final tournament).

References

External links
 
  Profile

1954 births
Sportspeople from Astrakhan
2015 deaths
Soviet footballers
Association football defenders
Soviet Union international footballers
Soviet Top League players
FC Lada-Tolyatti players
PFC Krylia Sovetov Samara players
Russian Premier League players
FC Torpedo Moscow players
FC Dynamo Moscow players
Russian footballers
FC Volgar Astrakhan managers
Russian football managers
FC Volgar Astrakhan players
FC Neftekhimik Nizhnekamsk players